Soudan is an unincorporated community and census-designated place (CDP) in Breitung Township, Saint Louis County, Minnesota, United States. As of the 2010 census, its population was 446.

The community is located immediately east of the city of Tower on State Highway 1 (MN 1) and State Highway 169 (MN 169).

It is the home of McKinley Park, a park and campground operated by Breitung Township, named in honor of former President of the United States, William McKinley, who was in office from 1897 to 1901.

The Soudan Underground Mine State Park is located nearby.  The park contains the University of Minnesota's Soudan Underground Laboratory which houses detectors, including MINOS, over 700 meters below the surface of the Earth.  Both the mine and the underground laboratory are open for tours.

It has a post office with the ZIP code 55782.

Demographics

History
The village of Soudan was established March 3, 1885. Soudan obtained its name from D. H. Bacon, general manager of the Soudan Underground mine. Bacon said that the severe winter cold is a strong contrast with the tropical heat of the Soudan (or Sudan) region in Africa, according to the online resource "Minnesota Place Names" from the Minnesota Historical Society. The village had a post office, established as Tower Mines in 1887 and changed to Soudan in 1888; associated with Tower Junction.  Soudan has since returned to being an unincorporated community.

The first mining exploration of the area took place in 1865.

According to the 1905 Legislative Manual of the State of Minnesota, the first mining done in northern Minnesota took place at Soudan in 1882. The Duluth & Iron Range Railroad had been built to the area. In 1886 the road was sold to the Minnesota Iron Company, which was absorbed into the Federal Steel Company and then into the United States Steel Corporation (operated by the Oliver Mining Company).

In 1903, the town was described as being located on the property of the mining company and no stores or saloons were allowed. The number of mine workers varied between 500 and 700 men.

Darby Nelson (1940-2022), writer and politician, was born in Soudan.

See also
 Soudan Underground Mine State Park

References

 Rand McNally Road Atlas – 2007 edition – Minnesota entry
 Official State of Minnesota Highway Map – 2011/2012 edition

External links
 Lake Vermilion – Soudan Underground Mine State Park (Minnesota Department of Natural Resources)

Census-designated places in Minnesota
Census-designated places in St. Louis County, Minnesota
Mining communities in Minnesota
1885 establishments in Minnesota
Populated places established in 1885